The Battle of Glen Shiel took place on 10 June 1719 in the West Scottish Highlands, during the 1719 Jacobite Rising. A Jacobite army composed of Highland levies and Spanish marines, was defeated by British troops, reinforced by a Highland Independent Company.

The rising was backed by Spain, then engaged in the 1718 to 1720 War of the Quadruple Alliance with Britain. It was intended to support a landing in South-West England, which was cancelled several weeks before; contemporaries on both sides viewed its failure as having fatally damaged the Jacobite cause.

Glen Shiel was the only battle of the 1688 to 1746 Jacobite Risings where the Jacobites remained on the defensive, rather than employing the Highland Charge. The battlefield is included in the Inventory of Historic Battlefields in Scotland, and protected by Historic Scotland.

The mountain where the action was fought is called Sgurr na Ciste Duibhe; a subsidiary peak named Sgurr nan Spainteach, or 'Peak of the Spaniards', commemorates the Spanish marines.

Background 
When the War of the Spanish Succession ended in 1713, Spain lost its Italian possessions of Sicily and Sardinia, and their recovery was a priority for Giulio Alberoni, the Chief Minister. Sardinia was reoccupied in 1717 but when they landed on Sicily in July 1718, the Royal Navy destroyed the Spanish fleet at the Battle of Cape Passaro, beginning the War of the Quadruple Alliance.

To divert British resources from the Mediterranean, Alberoni devised a plan for 7,000 Spanish troops to land in South-West England, march on London and restore James Stuart. Historians question how serious he was; since Alberoni was one of the few contemporary statesmen with experience of amphibious operations, he was well aware of how unlikely this was. Cape Passaro demonstrated the Royal Navy's power in far less favourable circumstances, which meant the Spanish fleet was unlikely to even reach England, let alone be allowed to disembark large numbers of troops. When the Spanish fleet finally left Cádiz in March, it was battered by a ferocious storm, and took refuge in Coruña, where it remained.

The plan included a simultaneous rising in Scotland, to capture Inverness, and allow a Swedish expeditionary force to disembark. Driven by Charles XII of Sweden's dispute with Hanover, it shows the complexity caused by its ruler George I also being British monarch. Charles died in November 1718, ending any hope of Swedish support, and thus the entire purpose of the Scottish uprising.

In the end, only two frigates carrying George Keith and 300 Spanish soldiers reached Stornoway in the Isle of Lewis. Here they were joined by exiles from France, including the Earl of Seaforth, James Keith, the Marquess of Tullibardine, Lord George Murray and Cameron of Lochiel. On 13 April, they learned of the failure elsewhere; Tullibardine, who was commander of Jacobite land forces, recommended retreat, but Keith prevented this by ordering the two frigates back to Spain.

With no other option, the main force of around 1,000 Highlanders plus the Spanish troops prepared to march on Inverness, leaving their excess stores at Eilean Donan guarded by 40 Spaniards. On 10 May, a British naval squadron captured the castle, blocking any escape by sea, while Joseph Wightman's force of around 1,000 men with four Coehorn mortars advanced towards Glen Shiel. On 9 June, they reached Loch Cluanie, less than 8 miles (13 km) from the Jacobite camp.

The battle 

John Henry Bastide, a subaltern in Montague's regiment who had a long career as a military engineer drew a detailed plan of the battlefield and the movements of the opposing forces soon after the battle. The section detailing the battle itself is missing but it is possible to reconstruct the main elements.

Tullibardine prepared a strong position near the Five Sisters hills, with the Spanish in the centre and the Highlanders on the flanks behind a series of trenches and barricades. Wightman's force arrived about 4:00 pm on 10 June and began the attack an hour later by firing their mortars at the Jacobite flanking positions. This caused few casualties but the Scots had not encountered mortars before, allowing four platoons of Clayton's and Munro's to advance up the hill to their lines, then use grenades to bomb them out of their positions.

Once the Jacobite right had been dislodged, Harrison and Montague attacked the Jacobite left under Lord Seaforth. This was strongly entrenched behind a group of rocks on the hillside but skilful use of the mortars forced Seaforth's men to give way while he himself was badly wounded. Commanded by Colonel Nicolas de Castro Bolaño, the Spanish in the centre stood their ground, but had to withdraw up the mountain as their flanks gave way.

The battle lasted until 9:00 pm; several accounts claim the heather caught fire and smoke combined with failing light enabled the bulk of the Scots to disappear into the night. The Spanish surrendered next morning, and as regular troops were later shipped home; Lord George Murray, Seaforth and Tullibardine were wounded but the Jacobite leaders also managed to escape. An analysis by historian Peter Simpson attributes Wightman's victory to skilful use of mortars, the superior firepower of his grenadiers and the aggression shown by his infantry.

Aftermath 

Jacobite casualties were hard to estimate since few bodies were left on the field and the wounded managed to escape, including Seaforth and Lord George Murray; Wightman lost 21 killed and 120 wounded. Lord Carpenter, commander in Scotland, advised London pursuing the rebels was impractical, and it was best to let them go, arguing the Rising had only damaged the Jacobite cause. Tullibardine concurred; in his letter of 16 June 1719 to the Earl of Mar, he provides a description of the battle, and states "it bid fair to ruin the King's Interest and faithful subjects in these parts".

In October 1719, a British naval expedition captured the Spanish port of Vigo, held it for ten days, destroyed vast quantities of stores and equipment, then re-embarked unopposed, with huge quantities of loot. This demonstration of naval power led to Alberoni's dismissal, and ended Spanish support for the Jacobites.

Senior Jacobites like Bolingbroke, Seaforth and Lord George Murray were allowed home, while others took service elsewhere. James Keith became a Prussian general, and was killed at Hochkirch in 1758. George joined the Prussian diplomatic corps; he refused to join the 1745 Rising, and was ambassador to Spain from 1759 to 1761. Although pardoned in 1763, he died in Potsdam in 1778.

Tullibardine remained in exile, took part in the 1745 Rising, and died in the Tower of London in July 1746. Lord George served as one of Prince Charles' senior commanders, and died in the Dutch Republic in October 1760.

Conservation of battlefield 
The area known as 'Spanish Hill' is now owned by the National Trust for Scotland. The stone breastworks built by the Jacobites on the northern slope are a rare example of surviving fieldworks in Britain, and designated a scheduled monument.

In advance of the 300th anniversary of the battle, the National Trust for Scotland was involved in an archaeological survey of the site. Finds included ammunition from the mortars which were deployed against the Jacobite forces.

Footnotes

References

Sources
 
 
 
 
 
 
 
 
 
Jonathan Oates, DUTCH FORCES IN EIGHTEENTH-CENTURY BRITAIN: A BRITISH PERSPECTIVE, Journal of the Society for Army Historical Research, Vol. 85, No.341 (Spring 2007), pp. 20–39

Bibliography

External links 
 Digitised copy of the "A Plan of the Field of Battle that was fought on ye 10th of June 1719, at the Pass of Glenshiels in Kintail North Britain" drawn by John Henri Bastide in 1719 from National Library of Scotland
 Battle of Glen Shiel@Historynet.com

1719 in Great Britain
1719 in Scotland
Jacobite rising of 1719
Glen Shiel
Glen Shiel 1719
Glen Shiel 1719
Glen Shiel 1719
Skye and Lochalsh
Glenshiel
Glen Shiel
Glen Shiel
Battles involving the Dutch Republic